{{DISPLAYTITLE:C10H13NO}}
The molecular formula C10H13NO (molar mass: 163.21 g/mol, exact mass: 163.0997 u) may refer to:

 Formetamide
 Kairine
 MEAI
 Methcathinone
 4-Methylcathinone